Leong Mun Wai (born 1959) is a Singaporean politician and business executive. A member of the opposition Progress Singapore Party (PSP), he has been a Non-Constituency Member of Parliament of the 14th Parliament of Singapore since 2020.

Education
Leong was educated at Raffles Institution in the 1970s. He was awarded an Overseas Merit Scholarship by the Singapore Government in 1979 to study economics at Hitotsubashi University in Japan. Leong furthered his education and obtained a Master of Science degree in management from London Business School in 1992.

Career 
Leong began his career in 1986 with the Government of Singapore Investment Corporation and subsequently worked with global investment banks in Tokyo, London and Hong Kong, assisting more than 100 companies in their IPOs and fund raising. He returned to Singapore in 1997 to assume an appointment as Managing Director of OCBC Securities, a wholly owned subsidiary of OCBC Bank, and one of the leading securities and futures brokerage firms in Singapore. He is currently the Chief Executive Officer of his own private equity firm, Timbre Capital.

Political career 
Leong was appointed as assistant secretary-general of the Progress Singapore Party on 17 January 2020.

In the 2020 Singaporean general election, Leong contested in the West Coast Group Representation Constituency as part of a five-member PSP team.  The team narrowly lost to the People's Action Party with 48.31% of the vote.

However, as the Parliament of Singapore requires a total of 12 opposition members, and with Workers' Party having won 10 seats, as the best performing defeated team, 2 Non-constituency Member of Parliament (NCMP) seats could be offered to Leong's team. PSP announced that they had chosen Leong and Hazel Poa for the NCMP seats after deliberations. The Returning Officer of the general election, Tan Meng Dui, declared them to be NCMPs with effect from 16 July 2020. Four days later, he stepped down as assistant secretary-general of PSP to focus on his NCMP duties, with the position handed over to Francis Yuen.

References

External links

 Leong Mun Wai on Parliament of Singapore
 
 

Progress Singapore Party politicians
Singaporean politicians of Chinese descent
Hitotsubashi University alumni
Alumni of London Business School
Living people
1959 births
Singaporean Non-constituency Members of Parliament
Raffles Institution alumni